Fortunatus Victor Costa (18th/19th centuries) was a minor Maltese philosopher who specialised in metaphysics.

Life
Almost nothing is known as yet about the personal life of Costa, only that he hailed from Senglea, Malta, and that in 1806 he was a religious cleric. He might have been studying for the priesthood or else embraced the clerical state on a lifelong basis.

Extant work
Only one work of Costa survives: the Metaphysicæ Elementa (Metaphysical Matters), composed in 1806. It is still in manuscript form, and of course deals with metaphysics. The work is organised in the typical style of Scholasticism, that is, in parts and chapters as was then used in the schools.

The document is a type of traditional treatise on metaphysics. It is simple in style and unassuming in content.

References

Sources
 Mark Montebello, Il-Ktieb tal-Filosofija f’Malta (A Source Book of Philosophy in Malta), PIN Publications, Malta, 2001.

See also
Philosophy in Malta

19th-century Maltese philosophers
People from Senglea